The American Bank Note Company Printing Plant is a repurposed printing plant in the Hunts Point neighborhood of the Bronx in New York City. It was built in 1909 by the American Bank Note Company, contemporaneously with their corporate headquarters in Manhattan.  In addition to printing paper documents, stamps, and currency, the plant also minted coins, and was thus known by local area residents as The Penny Factory.

The main structure includes three interconnected buildings. The Lafayette wing, spanning the south side of the block, is the longest and tallest. It incorporates the main entrance, at the base of an imposing tower. The lower, but more massive, Garrison wing is perpendicular to that. These two were built first, and constitute the bulk of the complex. The Barretto wing is an addition on the west side of the Garrison wing. The small detached North Building is at the rear of the property.

The buildings total , occupying the  block bordered by Garrison Avenue, Tiffany Street, Lafayette Avenue, and Barretto Street. The block is roughly pentagonal, with Barretto curving to form two sides.

The plant was used by American Bank Note from 1911 until 1986.  Production included bank notes, stamps, stock and bond certificates, checks, traveler's checks, letters of credit, lottery tickets, food stamps, and other financial documents.  Although the plant printed money for countries around the world, it was best known for producing currencies for Latin America, including Mexico, Brazil, Costa Rica, Ecuador,  Haiti, and Cuba.

Since 1986, the property has changed hands several times, undergone a series of renovations, and been designated a New York City landmark.  , it has been subdivided and rented to multiple tenants.

Previous land use

Until the late 19th century, the land where the plant stands was part of the Village of West Farms in Westchester County. The area that is now the Barretto Street block was part of the  estate of Edward G. Faile, where the Faile Mansion (Woodside) was built in 1832. Faile lived there until his death in 1870, after which the house continued to be occupied by his family. Modern-day Faile Street, three blocks east of Barretto Street, preserves its legacy.

The area was annexed to New York City in 1874. In 1904, the estate was sold to the Central Realty Bond & Trust Co for about $1,000,000.  By 1908, the estate had passed into the hands of a George F. Johnson (possibly the businessman George F. Johnson).

Land acquisition and construction
The American Banknote Company had their original printing plants in Manhattan, including at 78-86 Trinity Place, on Sixth Avenue, and at several other locations.  Seeking to consolidate the printing operations of its several Manhattan locations, the company spent three years searching for a new location.  In 1908, they purchased the Barretto Street block from George Johnson.  The sale closed on November 20, 1908; the next day The New York Times reported on the sale on its front page.  It was expected that the Trinity Place plant would be sold.

The estate was razed in 1909 to clear the lot for construction of the plant.  Kirby, Petit & Green (who also designed the company's downtown headquarters) was engaged for the design.  The total cost for the project was estimated at $2,000,000, with Kirby, Petit & Green already preparing preliminary plans before the land was acquired.  At the time, American Bank Note had a capitalization of $10,000,000.  In addition to the several printing locations in New York City, they also had plants in Boston and Philadelphia.

Wages for employees were estimated to be $40 to $75 per week for "the highest class of skilled labor", and construction plans included housing for the workers.  Not unlike the uplift in real estate values that would be driven a century later by the renovation of this site, the initial construction was estimated to increase taxable values in the neighborhood by $5 million within the next two or three years.  It was anticipated that 2,500 to 3,000 people would be initially employed, with the facility being sized to accommodate growth to 5,000.

Design iterations 

The New York Times reported on May 23, 1909, that construction was "almost ready to begin", describing a structure only somewhat similar to what was actually built.  This initial design included a long wing running the length of the Lafayette Avenue frontage, where the engraving and lithographing departments would be housed. Two additional wings, running along the Tiffany and Garrison sides of the property, enclosed a storage building in the V-shaped central area.  Each of these wings was an independent structure, with all four buildings interconnected.

About the same time, an article was published in Printing Art (reprinted in The Cement Age), which described a prototype design for "an ideal printing plant". The final design was apparently influenced by this, as the constructed plant more closely resembles this "ideal" design than the original one shown in the New York Times article.  In common with the original design was the Lafayette wing, which included the only entrance to the plant.   The Times described as an "unusual detail ... made necessary by the character of much of the company's business".

Site description 

The initial 1911 construction consisted of only two buildings; the long office wing along Lafayette Avenue, and the large press building at right angles to it.  Several additions were made over the next few years.  Typical of printing plants, the buildings have an open floor plan, concrete floors, and high ceilings, to accommodate large presses.

The site included 200 presses, a private restaurant, hospital, laundry, machine and carpenter shops, and laboratories where special inks were formulated.  The electrical requirements for the press motors and lighting was exceptional for the day, requiring special provisioning by the New York Edison Company.

In 2008, all of the buildings on the Lafayette Avenue block were designated a historic landmark by the New York Landmarks Preservation Foundation.

Lafayette wing 

Along Lafayette Avenue was a tall but narrow building which contained offices and workrooms for plate preparation.  This runs the full length of the street frontage, almost .

The exterior façade of the building is brick, with a structural framework of steel, allowing for wide unbroken arches filled with glass. Such large windows, unusual for the time, allowed daylight to flood into the building, necessary for visual inspection of detailed and colored printing work.  The building also used modern incandescent and arc lighting.

The Lafayette wing was originally constructed as three stories, three bays deep, with large windows topped by arches on the third story.  In the center of the block is a nine story tower, at the base of which is the plant's main entrance.  As Lafayette avenue slopes down to the west, the left-most portion of the building exposes several basement levels to the façade.  In 1925, an additional story, only two bays deep, was added to the top of the building, using materials that closely matched the style of the original.

Garrison wing 
A three-story (Garrison) printing press building is at right angles to the Lafayette wing; it has larger open spaces, heavier floor slabs, and taller ceilings to hold the presses.  The lower floors of this building included a vault for storing over 130,000 printing plates.  The presses were on the upper floor; the saw-tooth roof incorporated many windows to supply natural illumination for inspecting plates and printed documents.

North building 
Some time after the original construction, a detached garage was built at the corner of Garrison Avenue and Barretto Street.  According to a Landmarks Preservation Commission report, this was done in 1910, but this date is questionable since that predates the main plant's completion, and does not appear on a 1911 map.  The garage was expanded to twice its original size in 1928, to provide space for ink production.

Barretto wing 
In 1912, architect H. W. Butts added a single-story addition along the Barretto Street side of the property (what is now known as the Barretto Street wing) to hold a laundry and pulp mill.  There is some uncertainty about this date, as the extension does not appear in a 1921 map.  The extension was raised to three stories in 1928, by architect Oscar P. Cadmus.  The  space was used for additional presses and a machine shop.

Landscaping 
The area to the west of the press building, along Tiffany Street and Garrison Avenue, originally had manicured lawns, a curved driveway, and a pedestrian walk flanked by lampposts.  The lawns have since been turned into a paved parking lot, and most of the lampposts have been removed.

Other buildings 
In addition to the buildings on the landmark block, American Bank Note built a number of other buildings in the immediate area.  In 1913, there was built an employee welfare and research building on Lafayette Avenue, on the other side of Barretto Street, also designed by H. W. Butts.  A distribution center was added in 1925 and a paper storage warehouse in 1949. These additional buildings are mentioned (with their exact location and current disposition unspecified) in the Landmarks Preservation Commission report, but explicitly excluded from the landmark designation.

Engraving and counterfeiting departments 

In 1919, the plant employed 2,000 workers.  In the 1960s, the plant was processing over 5 million pieces of paper a day, and printing half of the securities of the New York Stock Exchange. The company employed what were said to be the world's most skilled engravers, who served apprenticeships of ten years or longer.  Some came from families which had been in the business for three or four generations. In 1958, the chief engraver was Will Ford, who had been with the company for 46 years.

One of the more unusual job titles at the company was counterfeiter; the job entailed attempting to produce copies of the company's own products.  When attempts were successful, better engraving, paper, or inks were incorporated into the products, to increase the difficulty of fraudulently reproducing the documents.  The counterfeiting office was in the tower (behind locked doors).  One official counterfeiter was Will Ford's father, William F. Ford.

Bombing
On March 20, 1977, the complex was damaged by a FALN bombing. The explosive device was placed near the Lafayette Avenue entrance.  Damage included broken windows as high as the fourth floor.  This was one of two FALN attacks that day, the other being to the FBI Manhattan headquarters.  A letter from the FALN stated that the plant was targeted because it is "one of the chief tools of capitalistic exploitation".  This was the fifty-first attack attributed to the group in the previous three years.

The next day, a second bomb threat against the plant was phoned into the Daily News.  This turned out to be a hoax by a local resident who was distraught over personal issues.  The man drove up to the plant while the police were sifting through rubble from the previous day's attack, announced that he had a hand grenade, and dropped it.  The grenade failed to explode and was found to be a harmless practice device.

Post-Bank Note 
By 1984, the plant only had about 500 employees.  In that year, the company's printing facilities were relocated to a new site in Blauvelt, New York.

In 1985, the site was purchased by Walter Cahn and Max Blauner and was repurposed as the Bronx Apparel Center.  The purchase and renovation costs totalled $8.3 million.  The center occupied  (about 1/3 of the site), housing several tenant companies in the clothing and fabric industry.  The Bronx Academy of Arts and Dance also had space in the building during this time.  Other tenants included a wine cellar, a homeless shelter, a photography studio, and artists' lofts.

The site was purchased by Taconic Investment Partners in 2007 for $32.5 million, who invested another $37 million on renovations.  Taconic sold the site to a partnership of two real estate investment firms, Madison Marquette and Perella Weinberg, for $114 million in 2014.   It is now one of the cornerstones of a Hunts Point revitalization.

Renovation controversies
Following the initial sale of the site, real estate values remained low in the area.  As developers started to move into the area and the site changed hands several times, the value of the property increased and rents began to rise.  This caused a number of controversies with community organizations.

In 2002, Lady Pink organized a group of female graffiti artists to paint a brick wall on the Barretto Street side of the property.  The group revisited the site for several years.  In 2013, the wall was torn down by the new owners.

One of the earliest post-Banknote tenants was The Bronx Academy of Arts and Dance.  When Taconic Investments purchased the site, the Academy was forced out due to rising rents.   There were also squabbles about being forced to pay penalties to break their lease.

Landmark status
The New York City Landmarks Preservation Commission started holding hearings in 1992 to consider designating the site as landmark.  Landmark status was approved in 2008.  A commemorative plaque installed in the main entrance lobby calls out the "crenellated tower", "massive brick piers", and "saw-tooth skylights" as significant architectural details.  Landmarks Commission Chairman Robert B. Tierney was quoted in the official announcement as saying:

The announcement also cited a "monumental arcade", the "Gothic-inspired details", and the "crenellated parapet of the central tower" as significant architectural features. The Real Deal describes the building as "one of the most architecturally distinctive office properties in the Bronx". Benika Morokuma, of the Municipal Art Society described the building in her testimony supporting the landmark designation:

Significant tenants
The John V. Lindsay Wildcat Academy Charter School operates one of their two campuses in the complex.  The school occupies three floors, and includes the school's Culinary Internship program, the student-run JVL Wildcat Café and a hydroponics garden.  The space was renovated using a $1 million grant from the Charles Hayden Foundation.

The Bronx Academy of Arts and Dance had their first home in the complex, converting previously vacant space into a 70-seat space for performances and workshops.  The Academy hosted the Arthur Aviles Typical Theatre dance company, with roots in Latino and LGBTQ cultures.  An anchor tenant with a long-term low-rent lease, they attracted other artists, who occupied spaces ranging from  studios to entire floors.  In 2012, they were forced to move out due to rising rents.

In 2010, the Sunshine Bronx Business Incubator began operations in the site, occupying .  Small business and startups could rent small amounts of space (as little as just one desk), with access to shared facilities such as meeting rooms, and a reception area.  Leases were available on a month-to-month basis.  The incubator targeted startups in the fields of new media, technology, biomedicine, healthcare and professional services.  Sunshine ceased operations in 2017.

Transportation

The site is adjacent to the New Haven & Hartford R. R. (now Northeast Corridor) tracks.  When the plant was originally built, the railroad constructed a freight spur to serve the property.  , the Penn Station Access project planned to provide Metro North access from a new Hunts Point station, which was proposed to be completed by the mid-2020s.

The site is directly off Bruckner Boulevard.  There is private parking adjacent to the Garrison wing.

The Bx6 bus line runs along Hunts Point Avenue. Bicycle access is via the South Bronx Greenway.

References

External links
Official building website
Our Ford Family / 1820 - 2000 / The Descendants and Ancestors of William F. Ford, Jr. by Ed Ford (Geocities, March 2000).  Accessed on 2018-02-01.

 links
  Video of event held in building, showing details of the Lafayette wing interior.
  Aerial video showing exterior of the building.

Commercial buildings completed in 1911
Commercial buildings in the Bronx
Printing in the United States
History of the Bronx
New York City Designated Landmarks in the Bronx
Hunts Point, Bronx
Historic buildings and structures in the United States